They (also known as They Watch or Children of the Mist) is a 1993 television film about the supernatural. A father loses his daughter in a car accident after missing her ballet recital. However, with the help of a mysterious old lady he is able to communicate with her spirit. It is based on an early-1900s (decade) short story by Rudyard Kipling.

Cast
 Patrick Bergin as Mark Samuels
 Vanessa Redgrave as Florence Latima
 Valerie Mahaffey as Chris Samuels
Nancy Moore Atchison as Nikki Samuels
 Rutanya Alda as Sue Madehurst
Brandlyn Whitaker as Kaitlin Samuels
Ken Strong as Len Ott

Nominations
Young Artist Awards
Best Youth Actress in a TV Mini-Series, M.O.W. or Special - Nancy Moore Atchinson
Outstanding Family TV Special, M.O.W. or Mini-Series

References

External links

They Watch at Amazon.com
They Watch at Yahoo! Movies
They Watch at Reel.com
Full text, plus illustrations, of Kipling's original short story, "They" (1904).

1993 drama films
1993 television films
1993 films
American television films
Films based on works by Rudyard Kipling
French television films
Films directed by John Korty